Leopold Blonder (1893–1932) was an Austrian art director active in the silent and early sound eras. He also directed five short films during the early 1920s. He worked on several mountain films with Arnold Fanck and Leni Riefenstahl.

Selected filmography
 The Mountaineers (1924)
 The Holy Mountain (1926)
 The Strange Case of Captain Ramper (1927)
 The Curse of Vererbung (1927)
 Knights of the Night (1928)
 Ariadne in Hoppegarten (1928)
 The Way Through the Night (1929)
 Two People (1930)
 Storm Over Mont Blanc (1930)
 Mountains on Fire (1931)
 White Ecstasy (1931)
 The Blue Light (1932)
 The Rebel (1932)
 The Dancer of Sanssouci (1932)

References

Bibliography
 Rother, Rainer. Leni Riefenstahl: The Seduction of Genius. Bloomsbury Publishing, 2003.

External links

1893 births
1932 deaths
Austrian art directors
Austrian film directors
Film people from Vienna
Film directors from Vienna